The 1975 British National Track Championships were a series of track cycling competitions held from 26 July – 2 August 1975 at the Leicester Velodrome. The Championships were sponsored by Newmark.

Medal summary

Men's Events

Women's Events

References

1975 in British sport
July 1975 sports events in the United Kingdom
August 1975 sports events in the United Kingdom